Red Lodge Provincial Park is a provincial park located in Alberta, Canada. The park is around 14 km away from the town of Bowden.

The park was established on May 7, 1951. The name of the park comes from the log house, painted red, on land settled by Mr. Thomas Crichley in 1900.

External links
 Alberta Community Development - Red Lodge Provincial Park

Provincial parks of Alberta
Red Deer County